South Jersey Gas, Electric and Traction Company Office Building is located in Camden, Camden County, New Jersey, United States. The building was built in 1901 and was added to the National Register of Historic Places on January 5, 2005.

The building served as the main branch of the Camden Free Public Library after it relocated from the former Camden Free Public Library Main Building, but was closed in 2011.

See also
Cooper Library in Johnson Park
National Register of Historic Places listings in Camden County, New Jersey

References

Office buildings in New Jersey
Commercial buildings on the National Register of Historic Places in New Jersey
Beaux-Arts architecture in New Jersey
Office buildings completed in 1901
Buildings and structures in Camden, New Jersey
Energy infrastructure on the National Register of Historic Places
National Register of Historic Places in Camden County, New Jersey
New Jersey Register of Historic Places